Al-Ḥabāb ibn al-Mundhir ibn Zayd was one of the prominent Sahaba and Ansar from the Khazraj tribe.

He participated in the meeting at saqifah during the Succession to Muhammad. He was also the one who advised Muhammad on filling all but one well during the battle of Badr.

References

Companions of the Prophet
Khazrajite people